Goffredo, also called Gottfried Baur, was an Italian cross-country skier who competed in the 1930s.

In 1937, he placed second, and in 1939 third at the 18 km race of the Italian men's championships of cross-country skiing, 18 km. He won a bronze medal in the 4 x 10 km at the 1939 FIS Nordic World Ski Championships.

External links 
 World Championship results 

Germanophone Italian people
Italian male cross-country skiers
Possibly living people
FIS Nordic World Ski Championships medalists in cross-country skiing
Year of birth missing (living people)
Sportspeople from Südtirol